The Jaynes–Cummings–Hubbard (JCH) model is a many-body quantum system modeling the quantum phase transition of light.  As the name suggests, the Jaynes–Cummings–Hubbard model is a variant on the Jaynes–Cummings model; a one-dimensional JCH model consists of a chain of N coupled single-mode cavities, each with a two-level atom. Unlike in the competing Bose–Hubbard model, Jaynes–Cummings–Hubbard dynamics depend on photonic and atomic degrees of freedom and hence require strong-coupling theory for treatment.  One method for realizing an experimental model of the system uses circularly-linked superconducting qubits.

History
The JCH model was originally proposed in June 2006 in the context of Mott transitions for strongly interacting photons in coupled cavity arrays. A different interaction scheme was synchronically suggested,  wherein four level atoms interacted with external fields, leading to polaritons with strongly correlated dynamics.

Properties
Using mean-field theory to predict the phase diagram of the JCH model, the JCH model should exhibit Mott insulator and superfluid phases.

Hamiltonian
The Hamiltonian of the JCH model is
():

where  are Pauli operators for the two-level atom at the
n-th cavity. The cavities are treated as periodic, so that the cavity labelled by n = N+1 corresponds to the cavity n = 1. Note that the model exhibits quantum tunneling; this process is similar to the Josephson effect.

i.e., .

Two-polariton bound states
The JCH Hamiltonian supports two-polariton bound states when the photon-atom interaction is sufficiently strong. In particular, the two polaritons associated with the bound states exhibit a strong correlation such that they stay close to each other in position space.  This process is similar to the formation of a bound pair of repulsive bosonic atoms in an optical lattice.

Further reading
 D. F. Walls and G. J. Milburn (1995), Quantum Optics, Springer-Verlag.

References

Quantum optics